Pezaptera is a genus of moths in the subfamily Arctiinae.

Species
 Pezaptera chapmani Klages, 1906
 Pezaptera sordida Walker, 1856

References

Natural History Museum Lepidoptera generic names catalog

Arctiinae